Nyamitanga Division is one of the six administrative divisions that make up Mbarara Municipality.
The six divisions that make Mbarara Municipality include, Kamukuzi Division Nyamitanga Division, Kakoba Division, Biharwe Division, Kakiika Division and Nyakayojo Division.

Location
Nyamitanga Division is located west and south of the central business district. It is situated along River Rwizi which separates the division from the Eastern divisions of the city.

It borders with Kamukuzi Division and Kakoba Division in the north, Masha and Birere subcounties of Isingiro District in the south, and Nyakayojo Division in the west.

Nyamitanga Division has size of approximately 2,229 hectares

The division consists of the neighborhoods of Katete, Karugangama, Kitobero, Nyamitanga hill, Nsiikye, and Ruti.
The place is densely populated.

The Mbarara Catholic archdiocese and the Catholic radio, Radio Maria are located in Nyamitanga Division.

Points of Interest
The division has one of the best Schools and Institutions, in Mbarara which include,
Uganda Martyrs University Western Campus
Nyamitanga Institute
Maryhill High School
St Joseph Vocational School 
Nyamitanga Secondary School
Katete Primary School
St Agnes Center For Education Primary School
Welden School

Population
In 2002 census Nyamitanga Division was found with 11,622 people, In 2011, estimates showed that the division had 17,272 people. The 2014 census found Nyamitanga with the population of 23,314.

Mbarara District
Populated places in Western Region, Uganda